Pontedecimo is a district on the far northern outskirts of the Italian city of Genoa, and is located in the Polcevera valley.

External links 
 

Quartieri of Genoa